Mahabir Prasad (born 1918, date of death unknown) was an Indian footballer. He represented India at men's tournament of the 1948 Summer Olympics in London.

Honours
East Bengal
IFA Shield: 1945
Bengal
 Santosh Trophy: 1945–46

References

External links
 

1918 births
Year of death missing
Footballers from Bihar
Indian footballers
East Bengal Club players
Mohun Bagan AC players
India international footballers
Olympic footballers of India
Footballers at the 1948 Summer Olympics
Footballers from Kolkata
Association football midfielders
Calcutta Football League players